The International Journal of Educational Research is a bimonthly peer-reviewed academic journal covering educational research. It was established in 1977 as Evaluation in Education: International Progress, and it was renamed Evaluation in Education in 1979. It obtained its current title in 1986. It is published by Elsevier and the editor-in-chief is Allen Thurston (Queen's University Belfast). According to the Journal Citation Reports, the journal has a 2017 impact factor of 1.138.

References

External links

Education journals
Elsevier academic journals
Bimonthly journals
Publications established in 1977
English-language journals